Ambiedes (officially:  Santiago de Ambiedes) is one of thirteen parishes (administrative divisions) in the Gozón municipality, within the province and autonomous community of Asturias, in northern Spain. 

The population is 1,007.

Villages and hamlets
 Iboya
 El Valle
 Bardasquera
 Barredo
 Perdones
 La Piñera

References

Parishes in Gozón